Deh-e Sheykh-e Do (also known as Deh-e Sheykh) is a village in Derakhtengan Rural District, in the Central District of Kerman County, Kerman Province, Iran. At the 2006 census, its population was 19, in 5 families.

References 

Populated places in Kerman County